Wild Things is a 1998 American neo-noir thriller film directed by John McNaughton and starring Matt Dillon, Kevin Bacon, Neve Campbell, Denise Richards, Theresa Russell, Robert Wagner, and Bill Murray. It follows a high-school guidance counselor in south Florida who is accused of rape by two female students, and a series of subsequent revelations after a police officer begins investigating the alleged crimes.

Wild Things was followed by three direct-to-DVD sequels: Wild Things 2 (2004), Wild Things: Diamonds in the Rough (2005) and Wild Things: Foursome (2010).

Plot
In the upscale Miami suburb of Blue Bay,  wealthy Kelly Van Ryan accuses her high school guidance counselor, Sam Lombardo, of raping her. Following the accusation, her outcast classmate Suzie Toller, who comes from a poor family in the Everglades, makes a similar accusation. Sam hires attorney Kenneth Bowden to defend him. At trial, Suzie succumbs to pressure during cross-examination, and admits that she and Kelly concocted the false allegations to get revenge on Sam: Suzie for his failure to bail her out of jail on a minor drug charge, and Kelly for his affair with her mother, real estate heiress Sandra Van Ryan. Sam and Kenneth negotiate an $8.5 million settlement for defamation, which Sandra pays out using funds from a trust Kelly would receive only upon Sandra's death. After the payout, it is revealed that Sam and the two girls were accomplices who used the trial to extort money from Sandra.

Police detective Ray Duquette suspects the trio are working a scam. Against the wishes of the district attorney's office, he continues investigating Sam. He tells Kelly and Suzie that Sam has already transferred the money to an off-shore account. Suzie panics and goes to Kelly, who comforts her. Kelly, however, calls Sam and tells him they may have to get rid of Suzie. In the pool, Suzie attacks Kelly. They fight, but eventually end up kissing, while watched by Ray, unbeknownst to them. A few nights later, at the beach, Sam apparently bludgeons Suzie to death while Kelly waits nearby. The two then drive to the swamp, where Sam disposes of the plastic-wrapped body.

Ray and his partner, Detective Gloria Perez, investigate Suzie's disappearance. Her blood and teeth are found at the beach, while her car is located abandoned at a bus terminal. The D.A.'s office again insists that Ray drop the case, but he asks Gloria to watch Sam. Sam shows Gloria his files from the school on Kelly, which suggest she is troubled and violent. Meanwhile, Ray goes to the Van Ryans' guest house to confront the scared and upset Kelly, and gunfire is heard. Sandra rushes over as Ray stumbles out of the house; he has sustained a gunshot wound to the shoulder, while Sandra discovers Kelly dead from two shots to the chest. Ray claims Kelly fired first, and that he was forced to kill her in self-defense. No charges are filed against him, but he is dismissed from the force for disobeying orders.

It is revealed that Sam is in cahoots with Ray. Although Sam is displeased Ray killed Kelly instead of simply framing her for Suzie's murder, he agrees that they now have fewer loose ends to deal with. The two go sailing on Sam's boat, where Sam attempts to kill Ray. When Ray fights back, he is shot and killed with a speargun by Suzie, who staged her murder with Sam. Suzie reveals she was motivated to kill Ray to avenge the murder of her best friend, Davey, whom Ray wrongly shot to death and framed as a self-defense killing. Sam reluctantly accepts a drink from Suzie, who assures him she would not double-cross him; however, upon drinking it, he realizes she has poisoned it, before Suzie knocks him overboard and sails into the sunset.

Several mid-credits scenes reveal that Suzie was the ultimate mastermind of the plot: Upon finding that Sam and Kelly were in a sexual relationship, Suzie blackmailed Sam with photographs of the two using drugs during sex, convincing him to help with her scheme. Suzie subsequently orchestrated the meeting between Sam and Ray at a local bar. Later, during her staged murder on the beach, Suzie pulled out her own teeth with pliers to make her death appear legitimate. Finally, with Kelly, Ray, and Sam all dead, Suzie is met by Kenneth, who gives her a briefcase full of cash that he describes as "just walking around money" and a check for millions of dollars. As she leaves, he tells her to "be good."

Cast

Analysis and themes
Literary scholar John Thorburn notes that Wild Things is loosely based on several figures in Greek tragedies, namely Medea, whom he describes the character of Suzie as a "modern-day version of." He also notes that Kelly functions as a Phaedra-like figure, while Sam exemplifies both Jason and Hippolytus. Thorburn suggests that the film's "most under-appreciated element is screenwriter Stephen Peters’s obvious debt to classical mythology, tragedy and, especially, two Euripidean plays, Medea (431 BC) and Hippolytus (428 BC).

Production

Development

The film's screenplay was written by screenwriter Stephen Peters, who had previously written the independent film Dead Center (1993). John McNaughton, who had garnered acclaim for the horror film Henry: Portrait of a Serial Killer (1986), became involved with the project as he was seeking to make a more mainstream feature.

Kem Nunn was appointed to perform some rewrites of Peters's original version. McNaughton commented that Peters's original draft "is brilliant on plot and we didn't change any of it, but I felt Kem Nunn was stronger on texture and character and place. The producer, Peter Guber, sent us off to Florida, where none of us had spent much time and we spent ten days there getting shepherded around to places and meeting people who were like people in the story. When I read the script I thought As crazy as it is, I do believe it could happen in the world that we live in. Once I believe that a story can happen in the real world, then I know how to direct it."

The original screenplay featured a gay scene between Sergeant Duquette and Sam Lombardo near the end of the film, in which the men kiss in the shower, revealing that—similarly to Suzie and Kelly—the two had a homosexual relationship that allowed Lombardo to prey on Duquette in order to manipulate him, and ultimately con him out of the money. According to Kevin Bacon, the scene was modified to eliminate any suggestion of a sexual relationship between the men, as the film's financiers "didn't like the idea of men making out. They felt it went too far."

Casting
Kevin Bacon described the script as "the trashiest thing he had ever read" but "Every few pages, there was another surprise." Bacon also executive produced.

Robert Downey Jr. was the first choice for the role of Sam Lombardo that ultimately went to Matt Dillon. Downey was considered because of his highly publicized drug problems, and although he was in recovery he was seen as too great an insurance risk. Producer Rodney Liber said "we couldn't make it work," and the production company even offered to put up some of the money but "There were just too many lawyers and insurance people and bond-company people involved."

John McNaughton said Denise Richards' first audition was good but her much improved second audition convinced them to cast her. Richards' lawyer negotiated a detailed contract about how much nudity would be filmed, including the option to use a body double. Richards did not use a double and filmed the scene herself after drinking a pitcher of margaritas with Neve Campbell. Campbell's contract had a strict no-nudity clause. Campbell took on the role wanting to challenge herself, to do something different from her Party of Five character, and to avoid being typecast.

Bacon also had a no nudity clause in his contract but without giving it much thought allowed McNaughton to use the shot that he thought looked best, and a moment of frontal nudity was included in the film. He was surprised by how many questions he got about it at the American press showing, and noted that the European press did not ask about it at all.

Filming
Filming in the Everglades proved difficult due to severe weather conditions. A tornado almost crushed a couple of trailers. McNaughton said production had to be halted and the police called when a real dead body floated into view.

Release

Box office
The film grossed $30.1 million in the United States and Canada and $37.1 million internationally for a worldwide total of $67.2 million.

Critical response
On Rotten Tomatoes the film has an approval rating of 63% based on reviews from 116 critics, with an average rating of 5.80/10. The site's consensus states: "Wild Things is a delightfully salacious, flesh-exposed romp that also requires a high degree of love for trash cinema." On Metacritic, it has a score of 52/100 based on reviews from 20 critics, indicating "mixed or average reviews". Audiences polled by CinemaScore gave the film a grade "C+" on scale of A to F.

Roger Ebert gave the film three stars out of four, praising McNaughton's directing and the plot twists. He described it as "lurid trash, with a plot so twisted they're still explaining it during the closing titles. It's like a three-way collision between a softcore sex film, a soap opera and a B-grade noir. I liked it." Gene Siskel gave the film a marginal recommendation.

Janet Maslin of The New York Times  praised Campbell & Richard's performances, and also McNaughton's direction for adding "a decadent gloss to this far-fetched, quintuple-crossing tale", although she criticized the plot as being "loony".

In The Washington Post, Desson Howe described the film as "clearly a crock", and although it "may not have a single redeeming feature, but it doesn't have a dull moment, either." In the same newspaper, Stephen Hunter described the film as being "as tawdry as someone else's lingerie, yet not without a certain prurient watchability". The Orlando Sentinel said that the film, overall, missed the mark, but that Murray in his small role manages to steal the show.

Variety praised the casting of Dillon, Bacon, Campbell, Richards, Russell, Murray and Snodgress: "[Y]ou have an ensemble that appears to be enjoying the challenge of offbeat roles and unusual material. There's not a wrong note struck by the game group of players." The magazine also praised the film as "original" with a "glossy, unreal quality that nicely dovetails with the pulse of the drama".

Awards

George S. Clinton was nominated for Best Music at 25th Saturn Awards, but lost to John Carpenter for Vampires, another film from Columbia Pictures.

The film was nominated for Best Kiss at the MTV Movie Awards.

At the 1998 Los Angeles Film Critics Association Awards Bill Murray won the Best Supporting Actor for Rushmore and Wild Things.
The film won a Blockbuster Entertainment Awards for Daphne Rubin-Vega in the category "Favorite Supporting Actress - Suspense".

Home media
Sony Pictures Home Entertainment released the film in a standard DVD edition, followed by an extended edition featuring the unrated cut of the film in 2004. The unrated cut was subsequently released by Sony Pictures Home Entertainment on Blu-ray in 2007. In May 2022, Arrow Films released Wild Things in a limited 4K UHD Blu-ray edition featuring both the theatrical and extended unrated cuts of the film.

Legacy
In a retrospective on the film celebrating its twentieth anniversary, Entertainment Weekly writer Chris Nashawaty noted that Wild Things marked a peak in lurid sex-themed thriller films in the late-1990s, summarizing: "As a rule, movies like Wild Things fight an uphill battle with critics would want to seem above titillation. But this was one of those rare films whose underlying smarts couldn't be denied."

McNaughton commented in 2018 that he considered Wild Things his "most political film" due to its focus on social class, concluding: "Who wins? The girl from the trailer park! She’s all alone on the ninety foot sail boat, out on the Caribbean. Pretty much everyone else is dead. That was the nineties, with the concentration of wealth. But the girl from the trailer park takes ‘em all down. You know, I’m from the striving working class. A lot of the kids I grew up with, the parents didn’t care if their kid dropped out of school. But some of us had parents who insisted their children have an education, go to college, escape all that. So that’s where my heart always lies."

Related works
Three sequels were released direct-to-video, Wild Things 2 (2004), Wild Things: Diamonds in the Rough (2005) and Wild Things: Foursome (2010). The sequels recycled much of the plot, dialogue, and direction of the first film, albeit with different actors. All three films, take place in Blue Bay, as well as its high school, Blue Bay High and the Blue Bay Police Department (BBPD).

In 2006, the producers tried to develop a spiritual successor and John McNaughton was in talks to again direct a script by Stephen Peters titled "Backstabbers". Richards and Campbell were also in talks to star.

References

Sources

External links

 
 
 
 
 

1998 crime drama films
1998 crime thriller films
1998 films
1990s erotic thriller films
1990s mystery drama films
1990s mystery thriller films
1990s teen drama films
1990s thriller drama films
American courtroom films
American crime drama films
American crime thriller films
American erotic drama films
American erotic thriller films
American exploitation films
American films about revenge
American LGBT-related films
American mystery drama films
American mystery thriller films
American neo-noir films 
American nonlinear narrative films
American teen drama films
American thriller drama films
Bisexuality-related films
Columbia Pictures films
1990s English-language films
Erotic mystery films
Films about rape
Films about social class
Films about threesomes
Films based on works by Euripides
Films directed by John McNaughton
Films scored by George S. Clinton
Films set in Coral Gables, Florida
Films set in Miami
Films shot in Los Angeles
Films shot in Miami
Incest in film
LGBT-related thriller films
Mandalay Pictures films
Teen crime films
Teen mystery films
Teen thriller films
Teensploitation
1990s American films